Cristaria is a plant genus in the family Malvaceae containing 20-30 species native to South America.

Species 
 Cristaria adenophora
 Cristaria andicola
 Cristaria argyliifolia
 Cristaria aspera
 Cristaria concinna
 Cristaria cyanea
 Cristaria dissecta
 Cristaria elegans
 Cristaria flexuosa
 Cristaria fuentesiana
 Cristaria glaucophylla
 Cristaria gracilis
 Cristaria insularis
 Cristaria integerrima
 Cristaria leucantha
 Cristaria molinae
 Cristaria multifida
 Cristaria ovata
 Cristaria viridi-luteola

References

External links 
 

Malveae
Malvaceae genera
Taxa named by Antonio José Cavanilles